An accredited registrar, also called an accredited certification body (CB), is an organization accredited by a recognized accrediting body for its competence to audit and issue certification confirming that an organization meets the requirements of a standard (e.g. ISO 9001 or ISO 14001). Accreditation means that certification and inspection bodies have been assessed against recognized standards to demonstrate their competence, impartiality and capability.

Legal status
Although not a legal requirement, accreditation is often stipulated and supported by local governments. In order to ensure equally high standards of certification across Europe, the European Commission for Enterprise and Industry set out a European-wide policy for accreditation. This ensures consistency in the accreditation market and is designed to protect the consumer. Accordingly, it is mandatory for every European member-state to have a single national Accreditation Body (NAB). In the UK, the United Kingdom Accreditation Service (UKAS) is the formally appointed National Accreditation Body, following the adoption the European regulation. The new Regulation (EC Regulation 765/2008), which came into force on 1 January 2010, requires each member state to appoint a single national accreditation body. UKAS has therefore been appointed by statutory instrument providing, for the first time, a legal basis for its role. The accreditation Regulations 2009 (Statutory Instrument No 3155/2009) making the appointment were signed on 30 November 2009 by Lord Drayson, Minister for Science and Innovation, and announced in a Written Statement to Parliament. In the statement, Lord Drayson said: “The Department for Business, Innovation and Skills (BIS) has a long standing and effective relationship with UKAS that both parties value highly. We will continue to work together not only to ensure that the requirements of the EC Regulation are fulfilled but to improve the quality and breadth of accreditation in the UK.” 

Outside of Europe, there is not a set regulation. For example, in the USA there are multiple Accreditation Bodies, whereas within Australasia there is the Joint Accreditation System of Australia and New Zealand. For those countries without a designated National Accreditation Body, the International Accreditation Forum lists member Accreditation Bodies International Accreditation Forum Members and Recognition Categories . that only accredit competent bodies, providing buyer confidence.

See also
International Accreditation Forum
Joint Accreditation System of Australia and New Zealand
United Kingdom Accreditation Service
Irish National Accreditation Board
ANSI-ASQ National Accreditation Board (ANAB)
National Accreditation Board for Certification Bodies (NABCB)

References

External links
ANSI-ASQ National Accreditation Board (United  States)
dakks.de / German Accreditation Council (Germany) Deutsche Akkreditierungsstelle (DAkkS)
National Accreditation Board for Certification Bodies (India)

Accreditation